Mounir Rachid Maasri (born. Aley, Lebanon; April 23, 1940), born to Rachid Maasri and Shafiqa Haddad,  is an actor, director, writer, and teacher for the Performing Arts. Maasri completed his early education in Lebanon, and travelled to the United States at a young age to continue his studies in the field of Performing Arts.

Education

From 1960 to 1962, Mounir Maasri studied under Lee Strasberg – one of the most famous teachers at the Actors Studio – at the Senior Dramatic Workshop in New York. In 1961, he was asked to start teaching other students himself, in addition to holding the leading role in several productions, including Julius Caesar, Othello, and A Streetcar Named Desire, among others.

Film 

Upon his return to Lebanon in 1962, Maasri began a prolific career – that was halted briefly due to the beginning of the Lebanese Civil War. In this initial phase of his career, the period of 1962 to 1975, he worked not only as an actor, producer, writer and director – often in two or more of these positions for a single production – but at times also as a dancer, production manager, make up consultant, lighting designer and director, in feature films, television and theatre. His participation was not limited to productions in Lebanon, but also included joint Lebanese-American, French and British projects. Works particularly worth mentioning are his leading roles in feature films Garo and The Mute and Love, for which he was later recognized with a Best Actor Award from the Lebanese Film Academy in 1967 and 1968 respectively, and a leading role in the Arabic-language version of Mohamad: The Messenger of God, during the filming of which he met and befriended late actor Anthony Quinn, as well as Irene Pappas.

Theater 

Starting in 1977, Maasri resumed his cultural activities, branching out as Lebanese Folk Dance teacher at the American Lebanese Cultural Organization in Los Angeles. In the following three decades, he continued to work as a writer, actor, producer and director, as well as undertaking other projects such as being tasked as lighting designer and director for several recitals by Majida al-Roumi (herself a recipient of an Honorary Doctorate from AUB), both in Lebanon and abroad – in events such as the Jarash International Art Festival in Jordan, the International Carthage Art Festival in Tunisia, the Baghdad International Festival in Iraq, and al-Roumi’s USA Tour in 1990 which included a performance at Carnegie Hall in New York.
Maasri took part in several international festivals with both his films and his plays. Such festivals include, but are not limited to, the Moscow Film Festival in the former USSR; the Carthage Film Festival in Tunisia; The East Meets the West in Rome; the 10`eme Rencontres Internationales -Films et Jeunesse, in Cannes; and the Baghdad Theater Festival, in Iraq. His awards, in addition to those aforementioned for Garo and The Mute and Love, include Best Film for The Mute and Love at Tashkent Film Festival (USSR) in 1968, Best Short Film for The Oriental Dance at the Tashkent Film Festival in 1971, and Best Play for The Dream Maker at the Carthage Theater Festival in Tunisia in 1985.
Maasri has participated in local and international festivals and seminars in other capacities: he was the Artistic Director for Anjar International Art Festival in Anjar, Lebanon, jury president at the Cannes Junior Film Festival in Beirut and artistic director of the ceremony in Byblos that marked the launch of the International Year of the Culture of Peace in 2000; abroad, he reprised his role as a teacher at the Performing Arts Dance Seminar in Brasília, Brazil, several times, and most recently, was an honorary guest and jury member at the 3rd International Urban Film Festival in Tehran.

Performing Arts Teacher 
Perhaps one of the biggest roles he has ever played – and continues to do so – is his role as a teacher. Maasri has taught at several different Lebanese universities, such as the American University of Beirut (Off-Campus Program), ALBA, Notre-Dame, Saint-Esprit de Kaslik, and Balamand, as well as Dulcina College for the Performing Arts in Brasília, Brazil. He worked as an acting coach on Brazilian feature film Baile Perfumado (winner of 18 international awards). Since 1998, he has been Dean of the Performing Arts School at the Institute Libano-European of Technology, as well the sole instructor of an intensive, multi-faceted program which trains and teaches students in the four interlinked disciplines of acting, directing, writing and producing for cinema and television. Many of his former students, who have nothing but praise for him (and in true technological generation fashion have set up a group on the social networking site Facebook, which currently has over 100 members), have pursued successful budding careers of their own in Lebanon, the Persian Gulf, Saudi Arabia, Belgium and France, among other places.
He also developed a program for teaching the audiovisual arts to children with special needs, and is backed by a diploma in Parental Guidance: The Development of the Human Potential from The Institutes for the Achievement of Human Potential, Philadelphia – USA. He initially implemented the program at the Institute Libano-European of Technology but was unfortunately unable to continue due to lack of funding.

Festivals

Film Festivals

The Oriental Dance: Tashkent Film Festival - USSR
The Mute And Love: Carthage Film Festival - Tunis, Tashkent Film Festival - USSR
Destiny: Carthage Theater Festival - Tunis, Moscow Film Festival - USSR, The East Meets The West - Rome, Italy, 10`Eme Rencontres Internationales - Films et Jeunesse Cannes, France

Theater Festivals
´The Dream Maker: Carthage Film Festival - Tunis, Tunisia, Baghdad Theater Festival, Iraq

Written Scripts

Arabic Language 
The Inspector
The Dove Prisoner
Destiny
Ricky and Rabih
Hymn of Life
Blood Wedding
The Finger
Tell Us of Freedom

English language

The Old Man and the Mountain
The Question
Bar of Angels
Tell Us of Pain
Favela

Portuguese language

Favela

Awards 

Lifetime Achievement Award, Teleliban 2007

For other awards see the filmography list.

Filmography and Theatre 
Feature films and Theatre

References

External links 

https://web.archive.org/web/20120227050707/http://www.nowlebanon.com/NewsArchiveDetails.aspx?ID=31532
https://web.archive.org/web/20110706150549/http://www.dance.art.br/en_staff/maasri.html
http://www.fondationlibancinema.org/new/index.php?pid=5
http://te-in.facebook.com/group.php?gid=83731795600
http://www.timeoutbeirut.com/performingarts/article/1904/infinite-desire.html
https://books.google.com/books?id=R2y0GaBgycQC&pg=PA379&lpg=PA379&dq=mounir+maasri&source=bl&ots=1k-UAvXgwb&sig=8LCmP5xGFK4NawTsBPLG1xMrOwM&hl=en&ei=gpbQS9PbEsT48AbEmqCzDw&sa=X&oi=book_result&ct=result&resnum=9&ved=0CBsQ6AEwCDgK#v=onepage&q=mounir%20maasri&f=false
http://www.abdogedeon.com/volleyball/mounirmaasri.html
https://web.archive.org/web/20110723122438/http://www.arab-art.org/arts.php?artisteID=2659&PHPSESSID=bed709c1a8eeb2f49bf5c6ab2d263620

1940 births
Lebanese actors
Living people
Lebanese expatriates in the United States